This page lists the World Best Year Performance in the year 2000 in both the men's and the women's race walking distances: 20 km and 50 km (outdoor). The main events during this season took place at the Olympic Games in Sydney, Australia.

Abbreviations
All times shown are in hours:minutes:seconds

Men's 20 km

Records

2000 World Year Ranking

Men's 50 km

Records

2000 World Year Ranking

Women's 20 km

Records

2000 World Year Ranking

References
IAAF
Women's 20 km Year Ranking

2000
Race Walking Year Ranking, 2000